Yarpur is a village in Hilsa block, Nalanda district, Bihar, India. It lies to the west of Gulni village. The population was 1,597 at the 2011 Indian census.

References

Villages in Nalanda district